The V. G. Khlopin Radium Institute, also known as the First Radium Institute, is a research and production institution located in Saint Petersburg specializing in the fields of nuclear physics, radio- and geochemistry, and on ecological topics, associated with the problems of nuclear power engineering, radioecology, and isotope production. It is a subsidiary company of the Rosatom Russian state corporation.

The institute was founded as State Radium Institute in 1922 under the initiative of V. I. Vernadskiy, integrating all radiological enterprises present in St. Petersburg (then Petrograd) at that time. The Radium Institute under Abram Ioffe was relocated to Kazan in World War II.

The Radium Institute was renamed to V. G. Khlopin in his honor in 1950.

See also 
 Yuri A. Barbanel
 Abram Ioffe 
 Konstantin Petrzhak

External links 
Official website

References 

Nuclear technology in the Soviet Union
Research institutes in the Soviet Union
Nuclear research institutes in Russia
Rosatom
Companies based in Saint Petersburg
Research institutes established in 1922